O'Reilly on Advertising (2005) was a popular show that was broadcast Saturday mornings on CBC Radio One, running from 11:30 – 12:00pm (half an hour later in Newfoundland). Its host was Terry O'Reilly, who is a radio/voiceover director with a lengthy career. Its producer and co-creator was fellow adman and broadcaster Mike Tennant. "The program explored the world of advertising in a fun and irreverent way," and is essentially a primer on media literacy, illustrating how advertisers create successful (or unsuccessful, as the case may be) radio ads. It ran for a total of 25 episodes, not including repeats, and concluded airing on December 31, 2005.

Some of the topics covered in the series include branding, the effective use of tag-lines, the Lion Advertising Awards at Cannes, and Public Service messages. It also examined why some advertising campaigns win or fail, how good copywriting can make a difference, and also trends in ad creativity.

The show was produced independently for the CBC by Pirate Radio and Television in Toronto.

A CD set is for sale on the CBC Store website.  It contains 10 of the 25 episodes and has a cover price of $49.95 Cdn. The liner notes for this set indicate that the included episodes are numbers 1, 3, 5, 6, 8, 9, 10, 11, 12, and 13 from the list below. The set is currently packaged in a black CD carry case with no external product information other than the set title.

O'Reilly and Tennant returned to the airwaves in 2006 with a follow-up series called The Age of Persuasion (2006 to 2011). They decided to "recalibrate the series", taking a longer view, and gave it the new name. The program "explores the countless ways marketers permeate your life, from media, art, and language, to politics, religion, and fashion."

O'Reilly's third radio series is called  Under the Influence (2012), now in its 8th season. This new series takes a much wider view, looking at the history, methods, and impacts of "not just advertising – but the expanding world of marketing."

Episode list 
 When Ads Go Too Far
 So You Want to Be a Voice Actor
 Celebrities In Advertising
 A Brief History of Advertising
 The Science of Advertising
 David and Goliath Ad Stories
 Music in Advertising
 The Sparhawk Beer Story (AKA "From Suits to Nuts")
 The Five Men Who Invented My Job
 The Wrath of Cannes
 Humour in Ads
 The Art of the PSA
 In Radio, You Are the Art Director
 Greatest Beer Ads
 International Ads – A Look Around The World
 The Importance of Branding
 Using Music as a Character
 Advocacy Ads – Selling an Idea, Not a Product
 Moments – Moments That Made Commercials Great
 Campaigns
 Good Briefs, Bad Briefs, Ugly Briefs
 The Great Debate – Creative vs Effective
 Great Writing
 Fashions in Ad Creative – Trends
 Desert Island Reel – Terry's Favourite Spots of All Time

References

External links 
Terry O'Reilly's official blog and site
Mike Tennant's website
The Age of Persuasion: How Marketing Ate Our Culture (Hardcover)
Pirate Radio & Television
The Age of Persuasion
10 of 25 episodes of O'Reilly on Advertising on CD (release date December 18, 2006)

CBC Radio One programs
Canadian talk radio programs
Canadian documentary radio programs
Radio documentaries about advertising